Mike Ross (born September 8, 1973) is a Canadian announcer, broadcaster and actor.  He is currently the PA announcer for  Toronto Maple Leafs and also a news director and host on AMI-audio.

He graduated from the École secondaire publique De La Salle in Ottawa and went on to study at Carleton University and volunteered at CKCU, Carleton's campus radio station, where he first did sports on the radio.

Soon after, he began working in the promotions department at Rawlco's Energy 1200 and Majic 100 in Ottawa.  In 1998, 1200 AM went all sports and Ross became the morning show producer and co-host on OSR 1200.

In 1999, when CHUM Limited bought Rawlco's Ottawa stations, he was moved to the afternoon drive show with Duke and the Dandyman.

In 2001, CHUM launched a national sports radio network, The Team and hired him to produce the afternoon drive show from Toronto as well as serve as a general sports reporter covering the NHL, CFL, NBA and Major League Baseball.

In 2002, when CHUM pulled out of the national sports radio project, Ross moved over to television as an associate producer for Rogers Sportsnet.

Ross joined XM Canada's "Home Ice" hockey channel  when it launched in 2005 (renamed Sirius XM NHL Network Radio in 2013), as the producer of the midday show with Jim Tatti and Gary Green.  Soon thereafter, Ross became the show's back-up host and co-host who filled in for Tatti or Green.

In 2008, Ross became co-host of the main afternoon show, In the Slot with Phil Esposito.

From 2009 until 2015, Ross hosted Hockey This Morning along with Peter Berce and Shawn Lavigne. The show was heard weekdays from 7am to 11am.

As part of a restructuring of SiriusXM Satellite Radio's NHL Network Radio channel lineup, Ross was let go on October 5, 2015 and replaced by Stellick & Simmer hosted by Gord Stellick and Rob Simpson.

From February 2016 until late 2019 Ross hosted Live From Studio 5, a current affairs morning show on AMI-audio for AMI Canada. The show was simulcast on AMI-tv beginning in the fall of 2018. Ross moved behind the scenes to become AMI's news director in December 2019. He continued to host as anchor of The Gazette on AMI-audio, until September 2021 when he became co-anchor of AMI-audio's daily news show, The Globe and Mail Today.

In February 2010, Ross was the guest PA announcer for the Ottawa Senators. Earlier in his career, he was also the stadium announcer for the Ottawa Lynx and the arena announcer for the Ottawa 67's. He was also the PA announcer for the 2015 World Junior Hockey Championships at the Air Canada Centre.

Ross became the fourth public address announcer in the history of the Toronto Maple Leafs, beginning with the 2016-2017 season.

In 2021, Ross started acting, landing roles on television and feature film and some voice acting roles as well.  He appeared on shows like "Hotel Paranormal", "See No Evil" and "Hours To Kill", along with the Gail Maurice-directed film "Rosie".  He also had voice over roles in the short film "Little Brother" and the virtual experience "Spacewalk".

References

1973 births
Canadian sports talk radio hosts
People from Ottawa
Living people
Franco-Ontarian people
National Hockey League public address announcers
Toronto Maple Leafs personnel